Esfahanak-e Olya (also Romanized as Eşfahānak-e ‘Olyā and Eşfahānak ‘Olyā; also known as Esfahanak and Eşfahānak-e Bālā) is a village in Chenarud-e Shomali Rural District, Chenarud District, Chadegan County, Isfahan Province, Iran. At the 2006 census, its population was 135, in 27 families.

References 

Populated places in Chadegan County